__notoc__

Apostolos "Tolis" Voskopoulos (26 July 1940 – 19 July 2021) was one of the legends of modern Greek music. He also starred in many films and played in the theatre in Athens.

One of Voskopoulos' greatest theatrical hits was Oi Erastes tou Oneirou (Dream Lovers), which he performed opposite Zoe Laskari.

Voskopoulos was married to former minister Antzela Gerekou.

Discography
This is a partial list of Tolis Voskopoulos' discography:

Albums
1967: Doukissa & Voskopoulos – Anamnisis
1968: Agonia
1970: Adelphia Mou, Alites, Poulia
1970: Se Iketevo
1971: Mia Agapi
1972: Stigmes Agapis
1972: Tolis Voskopoulos (Stichimatizo)
1973: As Imaste Realiste
1974: Marinella & Voskopoulos
1974: Marinella & Tolis Voskopoulos - Ego Ki' Esy
1975: Ego Ti Eho Ke Ti Tha 'Ho
1976: Smyrneika Ke Laika
1976: Otan Tragoudo
1977: Ine To Kati Pou Meni
1977: I Anamnisis Xanagyrizoune
1978: Tragouda Theatrine!
1979: Mera Nihta Pantou
1980: 80
1981: Kardia Mou Moni
1982: Den Thelo Na Thimame
1983: Eisai Dikia Mou
1984: O Tolis Voskopoulos Tragouda Manoli Chioti (Perasmenes Mou Agapes)
1985: Tote
1985: Tora
1986: Ametrita Giati
1987: 16 Ap' Ta Oraiotera Tragoudia Mou
1987: Atelioto Erotiko Taxidi
1988: I Megaliteres Epitihies
1989: I Megales Epitihies
1989: I Megaliteres Epitihies No. 2
1990: Tolis Voskopoulos Gia Panta
1990: Na Kanoume Enan Erota Olo Trela
1990: Oli I Alithia
1991: Stazeis Erota
1993: Konta Sou Ego
1995: Anepanaliptos
1996 Matia Feggaria
1998: Irthes San Oniro
1999: I Nichta Gemise Fos
2000: Ta Erotika
2001: Live 2000 – 2001
2002: I Sosti Apantisi
2003: Kali Sou Tichi
2005: Antitheto Revma
2006: Stis Zois Mou Tis Strates
2007: Na Me Koitas Sta Matia

Selected filmography

References

Sources

External links
 
 

1940 births
2021 deaths
Actors from Corfu
PolyGram Records (Greece) artists
Minos EMI artists
Greek male film actors
21st-century Greek male singers
Greek laïko singers
Greek film score composers
Male film score composers
Musicians from Corfu
Thessaloniki Song Festival entrants
Heaven Music artists
Musicians from Piraeus
20th-century Greek male actors
20th-century Greek male singers